Alonzo John Mathison (July 13, 1876 – November 11, 1941) was an American machinist, businessman, and politician.

Mathison was born in Stoughton, Wisconsin, the son of Thorwald C. Mathison (1852–1894) and Carrie (née Jacobson) Mathison (1845–1919). He worked in a grocery store and then worked as a machine shop foreman for Fairbanks Morse & Company in Beloit, Wisconsin. Mathison was also in the real estate business. Mathison served on the Beloit Common Council. In 1919, Mathison served in the Wisconsin State Assembly as a Republican.

Mathison died at his home in Beloit following a long illness, and he was buried at Riverside Cemetery in Stoughton.

References

1876 births
1941 deaths
Politicians from Beloit, Wisconsin
People from Stoughton, Wisconsin
Businesspeople from Wisconsin
Wisconsin city council members
Republican Party members of the Wisconsin State Assembly